Sailing to Philadelphia is the second solo studio album by British singer-songwriter and guitarist Mark Knopfler, released on 26 September 2000 by Vertigo Records internationally, and by Warner Bros. Records in the United States. The album contains featured vocal performances by James Taylor,  Van Morrison, and Chris Difford and Glenn Tilbrook of Squeeze.

The title track is drawn from Mason & Dixon by Thomas Pynchon, a novel about Charles Mason and Jeremiah Dixon, the two English surveyors who established the border separating Pennsylvania and Delaware from  Maryland and Virginia in the 1760s. This border later became known as the Mason–Dixon line and has been used since the 1820s to denote the border between the Southern United States and the Northern United States.

Critical reception

In his review for AllMusic, William Ruhlmann gave the album three out of five stars, writing that "in one song after another on this album, you get the feeling that he started out playing some familiar song in a specific genre and eventually extrapolated upon it enough to call it an original." In his review for Rolling Stone magazine, David Wild gave the album three and a half out of five stars, writing that the album is "a welcome flashback" to Knopfler's earlier work with Dire Straits. Wild continued

By 2002, the album had sold more than 3.5 million copies worldwide. In some territories—Western Europe for example—the album was released as an HDCD and a 5.1 Surround Sound DVD-A.

Touring

In 2001, Knopfler supported the release of the album with his Sailing to Philadelphia Tour, which started on 27 March 2001 in Mexico City, Mexico, included 80 concerts in 68 cities, and ended on 31 July 2001 in Moscow, Russia. The tour consisted of three legs: Mexico and South America, North America, and Europe and Russia. The tour lineup included Mark Knopfler (guitar, vocals), Guy Fletcher (keyboards), Richard Bennett (guitar), Glenn Worf (bass), Chad Cromwell (drums), Geraint Watkins (piano, accordion), and Mike Henderson (guitar, mandolin, violin, harmonica).

The Madrid concert on 2 July 2001 was filmed but never released. The Toronto concert at Massey Hall on 3 May 2001 was also recorded, but only four tracks were officially released: "Speedway At Nazareth" (the B-side of "Why Aye Man"), "Who's Your Baby Now" (the B-side of "Boom, Like That"), "Sailing to Philadelphia" and "Brothers in Arms" (both available on a limited edition version of the album The Ragpicker's Dream).

Track listing
All songs were written by Mark Knopfler.
International version

United States version(including Spotify, Apple Music, Amazon Music and other digital platforms)

Personnel
 Mark Knopfler – vocals, guitar
 Richard Bennett – guitar
 Jim Cox – piano, Hammond organ
 Guy Fletcher – keyboards, backing vocals
 Glenn Worf – bass guitar
 Chad Cromwell – drums
 Danny Cummings – percussion
 Paul Franklin – pedal steel guitar, lap steel guitar
 Frank Ricotti – marimba
 Aubrey Haynie – violin (1,10)
 Jim Hoke – autoharp, harmonica
 Wayne Jackson – trumpet
 Mike Haynes – flugelhorn
 Harvey Thompson – tenor saxophone
 Jim Horn – baritone saxophone, tenor saxophone
 James Taylor – vocals (2)
 Van Morrison – vocals (5)
 Gillian Welch and David Rawlings – vocals (8,10)
 Glenn Tilbrook and Chris Difford – vocals (International 6)
 Duane Starling – vocals
 Gillian Welch – vocals
 Chris Willis – vocals

Production
 Mark Knopfler – producer
 Chuck Ainlay – producer, engineer, mixing
 Chubba Petocz – engineer
 Jon Bailey – assistant engineer
 Graham Lewis – assistant
 Mark Ralston – assistant
 Aaron Swihart – assistant
 Denny Purcell – mastering
 Jonathan Russell – mastering assistant
 Andrew Williams – portrait photography
 Eric Conn – editing
 Sandy Choron – art direction
 Harry Choron – design
 Jose Molina – photography (front cover)
 James Gritz – photography (back cover)
 Andrew Williams – photography (portrait)
 Ben Mikaelsen – photography (additional)

Charts

Weekly

Year-end

Certifications

References
Notes

Citations

Mark Knopfler albums
2000 albums
Albums produced by Mark Knopfler
Albums produced by Chuck Ainlay
Mercury Records albums
Vertigo Records albums
Warner Records albums
Music based on novels